Data Respons ASA is a company that develops embedded systems within the areas of Transport & Automotive, Telecom & Media, Industry Automation, Energy & Maritime, Medtech, Space, Defense & Security, and Finance & Public. The company was acquired by French Akka Technologies in 2020.

The company has offices in Norway, Sweden, Denmark, Germany and Taiwan.

References

External links
 Official website

Computer companies of Norway
Companies established in 1986
Companies listed on the Oslo Stock Exchange
1986 establishments in Norway